Dominick J. Ruggerio (born December 19, 1948) is a Democratic member of the Rhode Island Senate, representing the 4th District since 1985. He is currently President of the Rhode Island Senate. A member of the Senate since 1985, he was previously elected Majority Leader on November 10, 2010, having won election to his 14th term in the Senate on November 2, 2010. Ruggerio succeeded M. Teresa Paiva-Weed as Senate president after the latter resigned to take a private sector job.

Background
Dominick Rugerio graduated from La Salle Academy in 1966. Ruggerio then attended Bryant College and earned his Bachelor of Science degree in 1974 from Providence College. He is a retired Administrator for the New England Laborers Labor Management Coop Trust. He is a member of the Board of Directors for the Wanskuck Library, the Sons of Italy, Loggia Vittoria, and the DaVinci Center Development Committee.

Rhode Island Senate
As Senate President, Senator Ruggerio serves as an ex officio member of all standing Senate committees.

Senator Ruggerio served as Majority Whip from 2003 through 2010. He has previously served as a member and as Vice Chairman of the Senate Labor Committee, Chairman of the Senate Subcommittee on Labor and Transportation, and as a member of the Senate Finance Committee, the Senate Rules Committee, the Senate Labor Committee, and the Joint Committee on Accounts and Claims. He also previously served as Deputy Majority Leader.

Senator Ruggerio is the “Dean” of the Rhode Island General Assembly, meaning he has served longer than any other member of the RI Senate or House of Representatives.

Prior to his tenure in the Senate, Senator Ruggerio was a member of the Rhode Island House of Representatives from 1981 through 1984, and was a member of the House Labor Committee and House Corporations Committee.

He served as a Policy Aide for the Office of the Lieutenant Governor from 1977 through 1981.

In January 2013, Senator Ruggerio was one of five senators to file legislation seeking a voter referendum to define marriage as being between solely a man and a woman in the Rhode Island Constitution.

Ruggerio was briefly redistricted to Senate District 6 in 2002, before being redistricted back in 2004.

Personal life
Senate President Ruggerio resides in North Providence and represents District 4, which includes portions of North Providence and Providence. He is the father of two children, Charles and Amanda.

Arrests and legal issues
In November 1989, Ruggerio was charged for maliciously damaging the car of a Lincoln businessman, Nandy M. Sarda, in September of the same year. In February 1990, he was ordered to pay restitution and to stay away from Sarda.

Ruggerio was arrested in September 1990 for shoplifting condoms from a CVS drug store, in Cranston, Rhode Island. He was not prosecuted.

In 2012, Ruggerio was arrested in Barrington, Rhode Island and charged with DUI and refusal to submit to a breathalyzer. He later pleaded guilty to refusing the test, but the DUI charge was dismissed.

References

External links
Rhode Island Senate - Senator Dominick J. Ruggerio official Rhode Island Senate website
Project Vote Smart - Senator Dominick J. Ruggerio profile
Follow the Money - Dominick J. Ruggerio
2006 2004 2002 2000 1998 1996 1994 campaign contributions
TransparencyRI.com

1948 births
21st-century American politicians
Living people
La Salle Academy alumni
Bryant University alumni
Providence College alumni
American people of Italian descent
Democratic Party members of the Rhode Island House of Representatives
Politicians from Providence, Rhode Island
Presidents of the Rhode Island State Senate
Democratic Party Rhode Island state senators